Garoza is a village in Salgale Parish, Jelgava Municipality in the Semigallia region of Latvia (from 2009 until 2021, it was part of the former Ozolnieki Municipality). The village is located approximately 14 km from the city of Jelgava.

See also 
Battle of Garoza

References 

Towns and villages in Latvia
Jelgava Municipality
Doblen County
Semigallia